Suave (born February 22, 1966) is an American R&B former singer, who hit the American top 40 charts with a cover of The Temptations' "My Girl" in 1988.

Discovery and success
Born Waymond Anderson, he was discovered at a New Edition concert in California in the mid-1980s when one of the members asked him to come up on stage and sing with them. After his initial nervousness on stage, he decided this was the career route he wanted to take. A few years later, in 1988, Suave released his first single, "My Girl," as well as an album, I'm Your Playmate. The single rose to #20 on the Billboard Hot 100 and #22 on the Radio & Records Pop Chart. Later in the year, he released a single called "Shake Your Body," which climbed to #22 on Billboard's Hot R&B/Hip-Hop Singles & Tracks. Today, Suave's songs are not commonly heard on U.S. radio.

Anderson was sentenced to life in prison in 1993 for arson murder in the torching of a crack house near the USC campus which proved fatal to a drug addict. During his years in the music business he admitted to being a drug dealer as well as an adulterer. He also perjured himself in court by recanting an implication of police officer involvement in the death of Christopher Wallace. Today Suave is still in prison although new information has been presented that he was in Jackson, Mississippi, visiting his sister the day of the alleged murder. He also has a wife.

On August 1, 2008, Suge Knight was formally accused of sending death threats to Anderson to change his testimony regarding the 1997 death of The Notorious B.I.G. in court July 31, 2008.

Chart statistics

"My Girl" (1988 - single)
03 Billboard Hot R&B/Hip-Hop Singles & Tracks
20 Billboard Hot 100
22 Radio & Records
"Shake Your Body" (1988 - single)
46 Billboard Hot R&B/Hip-Hop Singles & Tracks
"I'm Your Playmate" (1988 - album)
26 Billboard Top R&B/Hip-Hop Albums
101 Billboard 200 Albums Chart

"Rocked Your Boots" (1991 - Single)
(Did not chart)

Discography
I'm Your Playmate (1988)
To the Maxx (1991)

References

1966 births
American male singers
American rhythm and blues musicians
Living people
Musicians from Los Angeles
American people convicted of murder
Singers from California
American people convicted of arson